Ihlow is a municipality in the Teltow-Fläming district of Brandenburg, Germany.

Demography

References

Localities in Teltow-Fläming
Fläming Heath